Wettinia minima is a species of flowering plant in the family Arecaceae found only in Ecuador. Its natural habitat being subtropical or tropical moist montane forests, it is  threatened by habitat loss.

References

minima
Endemic flora of Ecuador
Endangered flora of South America
Taxonomy articles created by Polbot